Poseidippus or Posidippus ( or ) is a Greek theophoric name.  It may refer to a number of individuals from classical antiquity, including:

 Poseidippus or Posidippus (comic poet), c. 316–250 BC, a celebrated poet of the New Comedy at Athens, known for his novel use of language, and influence on the Latin poets.
 Poseidippus or Posidippus of Pella, c. 310–240 BC, an epigrammatic poet at Samos and Alexandria, some of whose poems are included in the Greek Anthology.
 Poseidippus, a historian who wrote about Cnidus, and whose work discusses the Venus of Praxiteles.  He may be identical with the epigrammatist.
 Poseidippus, a priest of Persephone at Pella.
 Poseidippus, son of Eupolis, stephanophorus (chief magistrate) of Miletus during the reign of Seleucus I.

References

Bibliography
 Dictionary of Greek and Roman Biography and Mythology, William Smith, ed., Little, Brown and Company, Boston (1849).
 J.J.E. Hondius et al., Supplementum Epigraphicum Graecum (Greek Epigraphical Supplement), Brill, Leiden (1923–present).
 John D. Grainger, A Seleukid Prosopography and Gazetteer, Brill, Leiden, New York, and Cologne (1997) .
 Michael B. Cosmopoulos, Greek Mysteries: The Archaeology of Ancient Greek Secret Cults, Routledge, London and New York (2003) .

Greek masculine given names